Gregg Tafralis (Gregory Louis Tafralis; born April 9, 1958, in San Francisco, California) is an American former track and field athlete.

Biography
Tafralis set the best world year performance in the men's shot put event in 1992. He competed for his native country at the 1988 Summer Olympics, finishing in ninth place. He won two silver medals at the Pan American Games, first in 1987 and then in 1995.

The second medal was taken away from him because of a positive test for steroids at an earlier meet. After his suspension ran out in 1999, Tafralis tested positive for a banned substance methandienone and was banned for life.

His personal best throw was 21.98 metres, achieved in May 1988 in Los Gatos.

Personal life
His son Adam, was a college football quarterback for San Jose State University who currently plays for the Hamilton Tiger-Cats of the Canadian Football League.

References

External links
Profile
USA Olympic Team

1958 births
Living people
American male shot putters
Athletes (track and field) at the 1987 Pan American Games
Athletes (track and field) at the 1988 Summer Olympics
Athletes (track and field) at the 1995 Pan American Games
Olympic track and field athletes of the United States
Doping cases in athletics
American sportspeople in doping cases
Track and field athletes from San Francisco
Pan American Games medalists in athletics (track and field)
Pan American Games silver medalists for the United States
Medalists at the 1987 Pan American Games